The Football League play-offs for the 1999–2000 season were held in May 2000, with the finals taking place at the old Wembley Stadium in London for the final time. The play-off semi-finals will be played over two legs and will be contested by the teams who finish in 3rd, 4th, 5th and 6th place in the Football League First Division and Football League Second Division and the 4th, 5th, 6th and 7th placed teams in the Football League Third Division table. The winners of the semi-finals will go through to the finals, with the winner of the matches gaining promotion for the following season.

Background
The Football League play-offs have been held every year since 1987. They take place for each division following the conclusion of the regular season and are contested by the four clubs finishing below the automatic promotion places.

In the First Division, Ipswich Town, who are aiming to return to the top flight after 5 years outside the top flight, finished 2 points behind second placed Manchester City, who in turn finished 2 points behind champions Charlton Athletic, who returned to the top flight after being relegated last season. Barnsley who are aiming to return to the top flight after 2 seasons outside the top division, finished in fourth place in the table. Birmingham City, who are aiming to return to the top flight after 14 years outside the top division, finished in fifth place. Bolton Wanderers, who as well as Barnsley are aiming to return to the top flight after relegation 2 seasons ago, finished 1 point behind Birmingham City in sixth place.

First Division

Semi-finals
First leg

Second leg

Ipswich Town won 7–5 on aggregate.

Barnsley won 5–2 on aggregate.

Final

Second Division

Semi-finals
First leg

Second leg

Gillingham won 5–3 on aggregate.

Wigan Athletic won 1–0 on aggregate.

Final

Third Division

Semi-finals
First leg

Second leg

Darlington won 3–0 on aggregate.

Peterborough United won 5–1 on aggregate.

Final

External links
Football League website

 
English Football League play-offs
play-offs
May 2000 sports events in the United Kingdom